The Senate was the upper house legislative chamber in Imperial State of Iran from 1949 to 1979. A bicameral legislature had been established in the 1906 Persian Constitutional Revolution but the Senate was not actually formed until after the Iran Constituent Assembly, 1949, as an expression of Shah Mohammad Reza Pahlavi's desire for more political power. The Senate was filled mainly with men who were supportive of the Shah's aims, as intended by the Shah. Half of the sixty seats in the senate were directly appointed by the Shah, fifteen represented Tehran, and the rest were elected from other regions.

The Senate was disbanded after the Iranian Revolution in 1979, when the new constitution established a unicameral legislature.  the former Senate building was used by the Assembly of Experts.

History

Constitution
Established as per Chapter 3, Article 45 of the Persian Constitution of 1906,

Building
The Senate House of Iran was designed by architect Heydar Ghiaï in 1955. The construction was led by Rahmat Safai, the dome being one of the most technically challenging projects in the entire endeavor.

The building is depicted on the reverse of the Iranian 100 rials banknote.

Members

Mahmoud Hessaby (1951–1963).
Ali Dashti for 1954-1979.
Jafar Sharif-Emami, Prime Minister of Iran (1960-1961 & 1978), was a member of the Iranian Senate.  He was its President for a number of years.
Jamshid Aalam (1973–1979)

List of speakers

Dissolution
During its years of activity, the Senate was once dissolved in May 1961.

Following the Iranian revolution in 1979, the government became unicameral, the senate was dissolved and the new Majlis convened in the senate building.

Elections

Votes cast

Seats won

Composition

1967 
As of 1967, the composition of the Senate included 48 members of the ruling New Iran Party and 11 members of the loyal opposition People's Party, while one senator was unaffiliated.

1971 
As of 1971, neither the New Iran Party nor the People's Party held a majority in the Senate, and had 27 and 9 members respectively. The remaining 24 senators were nonpartisan.

1975 
In 1975, all senator were members of the country's single-party.

Major events

1950 (February 9), first inaugural session presided over by Mohammad Reza Pahlavi.
1952, Mohammad Mosaddegh managed to obtain power to rule by decree — first, for a six-month period and then extended — due to his popularity.  Later, he organized a plebiscite in 1953, won the votes, and dissolved both the Majlis and Senate.  Upon Mossadeq's ouster, the legislative bodies were revived.
1961, Mohammad Reza Pahlavi dissolved both the Majlis and Senate; some time later they were restored.
1979 Senate approves the government of Shapour Bakhtiar.

Bibliography
M. Ghiai, Iran Senate House, Max Gerard Edt.Draeger Paris, 1976

References and notes

 
1949 in Iran
Legislature of Iran
Buildings and structures in Tehran
National upper houses